John W. Wagner (1837-August 24, 1896) was a Union Army soldier in the American Civil War who received the U.S. military's highest decoration, the Medal of Honor.

Wagner was born in Clear Spring, Maryland, and he entered service in St. Louis, Missouri. Wagner was awarded the Medal of Honor for his actions at the Battle of Vicksburg on May 22, 1863, for his gallantry in the charge of the volunteer storming party as a corporal with Company F of the 8th Missouri Infantry.

His Medal of Honor was issued on December 14, 1894, and Wagner died in 1896 and was buried in Jamaica Plains, Massachusetts.

Medal of Honor citation

References

External links

1837 births
1896 deaths
American Civil War recipients of the Medal of Honor
Burials in Massachusetts
People from Washington County, Maryland
People of Missouri in the American Civil War
Union Army soldiers
United States Army Medal of Honor recipients